Shepton may refer to:

Shepton, Texas, area within Plano, Texas, United States that was formerly a distinct community
Shepton Beauchamp, village and civil parish in the South Somerset district of Somerset, England
Shepton Mallet, small rural town and civil parish in the Mendip district of Somerset, England
HM Prison Shepton Mallet, a former prison located in Shepton Mallet, Somerset, England
Shepton Montague, village and civil parish in Somerset, England